Edward Creech Sherling (July 18, 1897 – November 16, 1965) was a Major League Baseball pinch hitter  and pinch runner who played in  with the Philadelphia Athletics. He batted left and threw right-handed. He attended college at Auburn University playing for the baseball and the football teams.

In December 1921 a fire broke out at the Stabler Hospital in Greenville, Alabama.  Sherling happened to be passing by, and saved several people by carrying them to safety. Three corpses were pulled from the ruins after the blaze.

Auburn University
Sherling was a fullback on Mike Donahue's Auburn Tigers football team.  He was elected All-Southern three times; and was selected to coach Donahue's all-time Auburn team.

1920
Sherling was a prominent member of the team in 1920, one of Auburn's greatest teams. Sherling also played on the 1921 team.  He won the Porter Cup both years.

1922

The 1922 team upset defending Southern champions Centre and is also considered highly; considered best by Sherling himself.  Walter Camp gave Sherling honorable mention on his All-America team.

References

External links

1897 births
1965 deaths
American football fullbacks
Auburn Tigers baseball players
Auburn Tigers football players
Philadelphia Athletics players
Martinsburg Blue Sox players
People from Jefferson County, Alabama
Players of American football from Alabama
Baseball players from Alabama
All-Southern college football players